The Le Favori was a French automobile manufactured in Paris from 1921 until 1923.  A small three-wheeled cyclecar, it featured a 987 cc twin-cylinder engine.

References
David Burgess Wise, The New Illustrated Encyclopedia of Automobiles.

Defunct motor vehicle manufacturers of France
Three-wheeled motor vehicles
Cyclecars